Marco Antônio de Oliveira Maciel (21 July 1940 – 12 June 2021) was a Brazilian politician, lawyer, and law school professor who served as the 22nd vice president of Brazil from 1 January 1995 to 31 December 2002, twice elected on the same ticket as President Fernando Henrique Cardoso in the 1994 and 1998 general elections. He was a founder of the conservative PFL party.

Prior to his vice presidency, he was the President of the Chamber of Deputies (1977–1979), Governor of Pernambuco (1979–1982), Minister of Education (1985–1986) and Chief of President Sarney's cabinet (1986–1987). Maciel returned to the senate following his vice presidency, until he was defeated in 2010.

Maciel was elected to the 39th Chair of the Brazilian Academy of Letters (ABL) in 2003.

Personal life
Marco Maciel was married to Ana Maria Maciel and had three sons. He was also a practising Roman Catholic.

He died on 12 June 2021 from multiple organ failure, due to post COVID-19 complications.

References

External links
 Marco Maciel biography at Academia Brasileira de Letras 

|-

|-

|-

|-

|-

1940 births
2021 deaths
Brazilian Roman Catholics
Vice presidents of Brazil
Members of the Federal Senate (Brazil)
Education Ministers of Brazil
Presidents of the Chamber of Deputies (Brazil)
Members of the Brazilian Academy of Letters
Politicians from Recife
Democrats (Brazil) politicians
National Renewal Alliance politicians
Democratic Social Party politicians
Governors of Pernambuco
Recipients of the Great Cross of the National Order of Scientific Merit (Brazil)
Recipients of the Medal of the Oriental Republic of Uruguay
Deaths from the COVID-19 pandemic in Federal District (Brazil)

Candidates for Vice President of Brazil